Unity is an unincorporated community in Unity Township, Columbiana County, Ohio, United States. It lies north of East Palestine at the confluence of Ohio State Routes 14, 165, and 170.

History
Unity was platted in 1810. A post office called Unity was established in 1828, and remained in operation until 1902.

References

Unincorporated communities in Columbiana County, Ohio
1810 establishments in Ohio
Populated places established in 1810
Unincorporated communities in Ohio